Bernhard Rühling (born 14 February 1969) is a retired German lightweight rower and Olympic competitor.

Rühling was born in 1969 in Stuttgart. He has won medals at a number of World Rowing Championships in lightweight quad scull (LM4x) and double sculls (LM2x). He competed in the lightweight double sculls at the 2000 Summer Olympics in Sydney, Australia where the team came fourth.

References 
Citations

Sources
 

1969 births
Living people
Sportspeople from Stuttgart
Rowers at the 2000 Summer Olympics
Olympic rowers of Germany
World Rowing Championships medalists for Germany
German male rowers
20th-century German people
21st-century German people